The George Darrow Round Barn is a historic building located near Alta Vista in rural Chickasaw County, Iowa, United States. The true round barn was constructed of clay tile in 1916. The use of clay tiles suggests that it was influenced by the work of the Iowa Agricultural Experiment Station in the early 20th-century. The barn features a two-pitch roof and a  central clay tile silo. It was built as a dairy barn and it was used as such until 1978. Dairy cow stanchions surround the central silo on one side of the barn in a circular arrangement, and horse stalls surround the other side. The barn has been listed on the National Register of Historic Places (NRHP) since 1986. It has subsequently been torn down. It was removed from the NRHP in 2022.

References

Barns on the National Register of Historic Places in Iowa
Buildings and structures completed in 1916
Buildings and structures in Chickasaw County, Iowa
Round barns in Iowa
National Register of Historic Places in Chickasaw County, Iowa
Former National Register of Historic Places in Iowa